Victoria, Australia contains approximately 32,000 hectares of temperate rainforest in various regions, which represents 0.14% of the State's total area. The areas with rainforest include: East Gippsland, Strzelecki Ranges, Wilsons Promontory, Central Highlands, and Otway Ranges. The rainforests vary between cool temperate, warm temperate, and mixed cool temperate.

Protection 
In Victorian forests subject to timber harvesting operations rainforest is protected by the Code of Practice for Timber Production (DSE 2007), which requires that:

"Rainforest communities in Victoria must not be harvested. Rainforest communities must be protected from the impacts of harvesting through the use of appropriate buffers to maintain microclimatic conditions and protect from disease and other disturbance."

However, mixed cool temperate rainforest has not been completely mapped in Victoria, and no pre-logging surveys occur to check for this forest type. Old-growth forest, with trees dating from pre-1900s, are also meant to be protected.

Victorian rainforests occurring inside national parks are protected from logging.

Rainforest does not regenerate following clearfell, coupe logging, which is practiced in Victoria.

Plant species  

There are many plant species found in the various rainforests of Victoria, which differentiate it from wet sclerophyll forest. This is a combined list of differential species from the various rainforest areas in Victoria.

Nothofagus cunninghamii, Myrtle Beech
Hymenophyllum australe, Austral Filmy-fern
Hymenophyllum flabellatum, Shiny Filmy-fern
Rumohra adiantiformis, Leathery Shield-fern
Crepidomanes venosum, Veined Bristle-fern
Blechnum chambersii, Lance Water-fern
Blechnum nudum, Fishbone Water-fern
Grammitis billardieri, Common Finger-fern
Microsorum pustulatum, Kangaroo Fern
Todea barbara, Austral King-fern
Blechnum fluviatile, Ray Water-fern
Blechnum patersonii, Strap Water-fern
Blechnum penna-marina, Alpine Water-fern
Parablechnum wattsii, Hard Water-fern
Cyathea cunninghamii, Slender Tree-fern
Cyathea × marcescens, Skirted Tree-fern
Dicksonia antarctica, Soft Tree-fern
Polystichum proliferum, Mother Shield-fern
Pellaea falcata, Sickle Fern
Asplenium flaccidum, Weeping Spleenwort
Asplenium gracillimum, Mother Spleenwort
Stellaria flaccida, Forest Starwort
Uncinia tenella, Delicate Hook-sedge
Carex appressa, Tall Sedge
Carex alsophila, Forest Sedge
Isolepis inundata, Swamp Club-sedge
Uncinia nemoralis, River Hook-sedge
Gahnia melanocarpa, Black-fruit Saw-sedge 
Atherosperma moschatum, Southern Sassafras
Parsonsia brownii, Twining Silkpod
Leptospermum grandifolium, Mountain Tea-tree 
Libertia pulchella, Pretty Grass-flag
Wittsteinia vacciniacea, Baw Baw Berry
Australina pusilla, Shade Nettle
Urtica incisa, Scrub Nettle
Coprosma nitida, Shining Coprosma
Acrothamnus maccraei, Subalpine Beard-heath
Oxalis magellanica, Snowdrop Wood-sorrel
Fieldia australis, Fieldia
Pittosporum undulatum, Sweet Pittosporum
Myrsine howittiana, Mutton-wood
Sambucus gaudichaudiana, White Elderberry
Pomaderris aspera, Hazel Pomaderris
Austrocynoglossum latifolium, Forest Hound's-tongue
Acacia melanoxylon, Blackwood
Bedfordia arborescens, Blanket Leaf
Podocarpus lawrencei, Errinundra Plum-pine
Syzygium smithii, Lilly Pilly
Cissus hypoglauca, Jungle Grape
Marsdenia rostrata, Milk Vine
Rubus moluccanus, Queensland Bramble
Rubus rosifolius, Rose-leaf Bramble
Morinda jasminoides, Jasmine Morinda
Notelaea venosa, Large Mock-olive
Tristaniopsis laurina, Kanooka or Water Gum

References 

Flora of Australia
Environment of Victoria (Australia)
Temperate rainforests